Lycée français Dominique Savio is a French international school in three campuses in Douala, Cameroon. The school has maternelle (preschool) through lycée (senior high school) education. It was established in 1972.

 The kindergarten is located in Bonanjo, next to the French Consulate in Douala and the elementary school is located in Bonapriso. The middle school and the high school are in Bonapriso, right next to the social siege of Eneo (the national electricity company) in Koumassi. 

In 2007, a total of 1090 students were enrolled in the establishment.

References

External links
  Lycée français Dominique Savio

Schools in Douala
French international schools in Cameroon
Educational institutions established in 1972
1972 establishments in Cameroon